George Beet may refer to:

 George Beet (cricketer, born 1886) (1886–1946), Derbyshire cricketer, wicket-keeper
 George Beet (cricketer, born 1904) (1904–1949), Derbyshire cricketer, his son